VPHS may refer to:
Ville Platte High School
Vinzons Pilot High School